Real as I Wanna Be is an album by Cliff Richard, released in October 1998 by EMI Records. It peaked at number 10 on the UK Albums Chart and was certified Silver in the UK and Gold in New Zealand.

overview
"Can't Keep this Feeling In" was released as the lead single a week ahead of the album and peaked on debut at number 10 on the UK Singles Chart. "The Miracle" was released in July the following year and peaked at number 23.

"Vita Mia", a duet with Vincenzo La Scola was intended to be the second single over the 1998 Christmas period. A video clip was recorded for it and artwork for a CD single was produced together with a promo CD single for radio. However, the record company EMI postponed its release until January, citing Richard's ill health as the reason (the ill health being a chest infection followed by laryngitis, which also prevented him from singing during rehearsals for concerts in November 1998). Relations between Richard and EMI at the time were also strained due to the lack of promotion and lack of sales of the album, and the single was further postponed until February before being abandoned altogether.

"Butterfly Kisses" had also been slated to be the third single from the album and a video clip was recorded for it also, however, neither did it materialise.

Track listing
"Real as I Wanna Be" (Peter Zizzo) – 4:32
"Even If It Breaks My Heart" (Adam Gorgoni, Phil Roy, Shelly Peiken) – 3:45
"Can't Keep this Feeling In" (Arnie Roman, Dennis Lambert, Steve Skinner) – 3:49
"Climbing Up Mount Everest" (Robin Lerner, Tommy Lee James) – 3:01
"United for Evermore" (Dennis Morgan, John McLaughlin, Steve DuBerry) – 4:21
"She Makes Me Feel Like a Man" (Cliff Richard, Michelle Wolf, Peter Wolf) – 5:38
"Butterfly Kisses" (Bob Carlisle, Randy Thomas) – 5:14
"Snowfall on the Sahara" (Ina Wolf, Natalie Cole, Peter Wolf) – 4:26
"Woman and a Man" (Noel McKoy, Michelle Wolf, Shelly Peiken) – 4:47
"Till I'm Home Again" (Amy Sky, Andy Hill) – 5:15
"Come Back to Me" (Michelle Wolf, Peter Wolf) – 4:47
"The Miracle" (Brenda Lee Eugar) – 3:28
"Vita Mia" (duet with Vincenzo La Scola, tenor) (Lyrics by Michelle Wolf, Zucchero Fornaciari; music by Peter Wolf) – 4:18

US edition bonus track
 "Had to Be" (featuring Olivia Newton-John) (John Farrar, Tim Rice)

Personnel

Musicians
Adapted from AllMusic.
Vinnie Colaiuta – drums
John Cushon – drums
Lynn Davis – background vocals
Kevin Dorsey – background vocals
Siedah Garrett – background vocals
Everette Harp – alto sax
James Ingram – background vocals
Matthias Jabs – guitar
Paul Jackson Jr. – guitar, sitar
Ricky Lawson – drums
Anastasios Panos – drums
Cliff Richard – primary artist, background vocals
Jeff Richman – guitar
Michelle Wolf – background vocals

Production
Marketing / Distribution / Manufacturing EMI
Phonographic copyright – EMI Records Ltd. / Copyright – EMI Records Ltd.
Recorded at Little America Recording Studios / Ocean Studios / Arco Studios / R.G. Jones Studios / The Pierce Room
Mixed at Little America Recording Studios
Mastered at Precision Mastering
Design – The Attik
Engineers – Chris Heil, Christian Leitgeb, Keith Bessey, Paul Ericksen
Mastered by Stephen Marcussen
Mixed by Julian Mendelsohn (tracks 10–12), Peter Wolf
Produced and arranged by Peter Wolf

Charts and certifications

Charts

Certifications

References

1998 albums
Cliff Richard albums
Albums produced by Peter Wolf
EMI Records albums